The 2011–12 BBL season was the 25th campaign of the British Basketball League since the league's establishment in 1987. The season featured 11 teams from across England and Scotland, with Durham Wildcats appearing in their first campaign after election from EBL Division 1. The League did not feature two teams from the previous season; Worthing Thunder had stepped down to the EBL, whilst Essex Pirates withdrew just two weeks prior to the season starting due to the loss of a major sponsor. There was also uncertainty regarding the participation of reigning champions Mersey Tigers, who had to postpone their first game due to off-court problems and operational issues.

Newcastle Eagles opened the season with an 85–63 victory over Northern rivals Glasgow Rocks in the BBL Cup, on September 30, 2011. The Championship regular season didn't commence until mid-October, whilst the initial stages of the Trophy and BBL Cup were played out prior to the Championship beginning.  Newcastle were victorious in the BBL Cup and BBL Trophy after beating Plymouth Raiders in the finals of both competitions. The Eagles also went on to clinch their 5th BBL Championship after Plymouth lost to Leicester Riders on April 11, setting a new record for the most Championships won in the history of the BBL. Eagles' 5th title beat the previous record of four Championship's held by Kingston Kings from the 1980s and 1990s. The season was wrapped up with Eagles stamping their dominance on the play-offs, defeating Leicester in the Final on May 12, 2012, and going on to win all four titles for the 2011–12 campaign.

Following the season's climax the British Basketball League, along with several other basketball governing bodies, united to form the British Basketball Union, a new organisation created to promote the commercial development of basketball within Great Britain.

Teams

Notable occurrences
Durham Wildcats were the newest additions to the BBL, having been elected to join from EBL Division 1.
Pre-season transfer speculation centred around the possibility of Los Angeles Lakers star Ron Artest signing for Cheshire Jets during the NBA lockout, after announcing on his Twitter account that he was in discussions with the club, who had reportedly offered him shares in the franchise. Other reports also linked Artest to Glasgow Rocks.
After ten years at Cheshire Jets, Paul Smith stepped down from his position as Head Coach prior to the season opening, leaving Assistant John Lavery to take the reins.
The Mersey Tigers franchise changed ownership following Liverpool-based businessman Steve Brookfield's acquisition from former owner Gary Townsend, who set up the club in 2007.
Essex Pirates officially withdrew from the BBL on September 16, just two weeks before the start of the season. The loss of a major sponsor was a major factor, and it was revealed the owners even looked at relocating to Crystal Palace NSC Arena in London before the decision was made to disband.
Mersey Tigers were forced to postpone their first game of the season amid fears of the franchise's imminent collapse. Off-court problems and operational issues were later cited as the reason for postponement, but the franchise eventually fielded a team and resumed play the following week.
A sell-out 1,200 crowd at Newton Aycliffe Leisure Centre saw Durham play host to their first BBL game, losing 66–88 to local rivals Newcastle Eagles.
An incident between Guildford Heat's Martelle McLemore and Plymouth Raiders mascot Foxy during a game on October 22 was the subject of a League inquiry after the mascot entered the court and pulled McLemore's shorts down during a break in play. Following the league's inquiry, Plymouth Raiders were given a "small fine" whilst McLemore was awarded with 5 penalty points for his involvement by pushing the Raiders mascot.
Glasgow Rocks' veteran player-coach Sterling Davis reached two personal milestones in October, making his 1000th BBL Championship free-throw and 5000th point scored.
After a 12-game losing streak, Guildford Heat finally recorded their first win of the season on December 16, with an 82–76 victory away to current Champions Mersey Tigers.
Nathan Schall, of Milton Keynes Lions, was the winner of the Kickz.co.uk Slam Dunk Contest 2012 which took place on January 15, prior to the BBL Cup Final.
Newcastle Eagles collected their first piece of silverware for the season on January 15, 2012, with a 115–94 victory over Plymouth Raiders in the BBL Cup final at the National Indoor Arena. Newcastle's Charles Smith set a new BBL Cup Final record by posting a 39 points, whilst Newcastle also broke the previous record of 103 for points scored.
Leicester Riders announced in January that their point guard Flinder Boyd had decided to leave the club with immediate effect "in order to pursue interests way from basketball." It was reported in March that the Great Britain international has officially retired from playing, just months before Team GB's Olympic Games tournament.
Newcastle Eagles scooped their second title of the season with another victory over Plymouth Raiders in the BBL Trophy final. The Eagles won the Trophy with a 184–177 aggregate victory in the two-game series, winning the second leg 96–80 at Sport Central on March 24.
With title-challengers Plymouth Raiders losing 96–72 away to Leicester Riders on April 11, the Championship trophy returned to Newcastle Eagles, becoming the Northeastern club's third title of the season. The trophy was presented to the Eagles at Sport Central on April 14 at their home game with Mersey Tigers, but celebrations were dampened as Eagles were unexpectedly defeated 74–82 by Mersey.
Due to the unsuitability of the John Sandford Centre venue for television broadcasting, Leicester Riders were forced to switch venues for their Play-off homes games from their usual home to their former home at the Sports Centre on the campus of Loughborough University.
Newcastle Eagles completed a 'clean sweep' of titles by claiming the Play-off crown with a 71–62 victory over Leicester Riders in the Grand Final at the National Indoor Arena, on 12 May. Newcastle's Charles Smith was awarded the Final's MVP, scoring 21 points.
Following the conclusion of the season, the BBL entered into a joint venture with other basketball governing bodies to establish the British Basketball Union (BBU), a new organisation created to promote the commercial development of basketball within Great Britain.
After four seasons in charge of Mersey Tigers, Head Coach Tony Garbelotto left the club at the end of the season to coach German Pro A team Heidelberg.

BBL Championship (Tier 1)

Final standings

The play-offs

Quarter-finals
(1) Newcastle Eagles vs. (8) Guildford Heat

(2) Leicester Riders vs. (7) Sheffield Sharks

(3) Worcester Wolves vs. (6) Cheshire Jets

(4) Plymouth Raiders vs. (5) Glasgow Rocks

Semi-finals
(1) Newcastle Eagles vs. (6) Cheshire Jets

(2) Leicester Riders vs. (5) Glasgow Rocks

Final

EBL National League Division 1 (Tier 2)

Final standings

EBL National League Division 2 (Tier 3)

Final standings

BBL Cup

1st round

Quarter-finals

Semi-finals
Leicester Riders vs. Newcastle Eagles

Plymouth Raiders vs. Worcester Wolves

Final

BBL Trophy

Group stage

Group 1

Group 3

Group 2

Group 4

Semi-finals
Newcastle Eagles vs. Sheffield Sharks

Milton Keynes Lions vs. Plymouth Raiders

Final

Statistics leaders

Monthly awards

Seasonal awards

Molten Most Valuable Player: Joe Chapman (Newcastle Eagles)
Molten Coach of the Year: Fabulous Flournoy (Newcastle Eagles)
Team of the Year:
Cameron Rundles (Leicester Riders)
Joe Chapman (Newcastle Eagles)
Ayron Hardy (Leicester Riders)
Richie Gordon (Worcester Wolves)
Paul Williams (Plymouth Raiders)
Defensive Team of the Year:
Paul Gause (Newcastle Eagles)
Demarius Bolds (Milton Keynes Lions)
Ayron Hardy (Leicester Riders)
Richie Gordon (Worcester Wolves)
Bill Cole (Cheshire Jets)
British Team of the Year:
Myles Hesson (Mersey Tigers)
Tayo Ogedengbe (Guildford Heat)
Andrew Sullivan (Leicester Riders)
Anthony Rowe (Plymouth Raiders)
Andrew Thomson (Newcastle Eagles)

References

British Basketball League seasons
1
British